Jessie Lawrence Ferguson (June 8, 1941 – April 26, 2019) was an American actor. He was best known for playing the self-hating racist police officer in John Singleton's Academy Award-nominated film Boyz n the Hood (1991).

Biography
Ferguson was born in The Bronx, New York, on June 8, 1941. He lived there until the mid-1950s until moving to Chicago, Illinois. His first major role was in Starsky and Hutch in 1979. Ferguson is best known for his roles in Boyz n the Hood and John Carpenter's Prince of Darkness and Sam Raimi's Darkman. He has also had roles in Mike Hammer: Murder Takes All, Star Trek: The Next Generation, The Adventures of Buckaroo Banzai Across the 8th Dimension, All Night Long and The Fish that Saved Pittsburgh. Ferguson died of a heart attack at age 77 on April 26, 2019.

Filmography

Film

Television

References

External links
 
 

1941 births
2019 deaths
American male film actors
Male actors from New York City